Bengt Frithiofsson (born August 25, 1939 in Landskrona) is a Swedish wine writer. He initially worked for various Swedish newspaper, after later became a wine and food writer for Svenska Dagbladet for 20 years. In the 1990s he moved to TV4 and the morning show Nyhetsmorgon.

Frithiofsson has also written a number of food and wine books. His first restaurant guide was published in 1977 and his first wine guide in 1983.

In 2009, he appeared in the first season of Kändisdjungeln (The Celebrity Jungle), the Swedish version of I'm a Celebrity...Get Me Out of Here!.

References

External links 
 bengtfrithiofsson.se

1939 births
Living people
Swedish food writers
Wine critics